Karita is a monotypic genus of dwarf spiders containing the single species, Karita paludosa. It was first described by A. V. Tanasevitch in 2007, and has only been found in Belgium, Germany, Ireland, Poland, Russia, and United Kingdom.

See also
 List of Linyphiidae species (I–P)

References

Linyphiidae
Monotypic Araneomorphae genera
Spiders of Russia